Nyamagana District is one of the seven districts of the Mwanza Region of Tanzania.  It is bordered to the north by Ilemela District, to the east by Magu District, to the south by Misungwi District and to the west by the Mwanza Bay of Lake Victoria. Part of the region's capital, the town of Mwanza, is within Nyamagana District. The district commission's office is scheduled to be re-located to the Mkolani area of Mwanza town, but currently it is still in the old city hall in the centre of town.

, the population of the Nyamagana District was 363,452.

Wards

As of 2012, Nyamagana District was divided into twelve wards.

2012 wards

 Buhongwa
 Butimba
 Igogo
 Igoma
 Isamilo
 [[Mahina, 
 Mhandu
 Mahina
 Mbugani
 Mirongo
 Mkolani
 Mkuyuni
 Kishiri
 Nyegezi
 Mabatini

References

Districts of Mwanza Region